Aimie Allen-Atkinson (born 5 June 1987) is an English stage actress and singer. She is known for portraying the role of Katherine Howard in British comedy musical Six on the original UK tour and in the West End production at the Arts Theatre, Lyric Theatre and Vaudeville Theatre, portraying Vivian Ward in the West End production of Pretty Woman, as well as forming part of pop girl group SVN.

Early life
Atkinson was born to parents Faith Allen and Tom Atkinson in Stevenage, England. Her father played part-time in a rock band, which encouraged her to begin singing from a young age. Whilst studying at Collenswood School in Stevenage, Atkinson was part of the Fusion Performing Arts group and took part in many of their productions. Having studied to GCSE level, she left school to complete a BTEC in Performing Arts at Susi Earnshaw Theatre School and then worked as an admin assistant in a music publishing company. She also ran a franchise for the Stagecraft school in Stevenage.

Career
After agreeing with a friend whilst studying at the Arts Educational School that both should apply to the BBC Radio 2 Voice of Musical Theatre competition, Atkinson was told that she could only apply for the amateur competition. After winning that, she joined a final competition against the final professional contestants - those with at least five years of stage experience - and also won that.

Aged 19, Atkinson left Arts Educational and became a full-time stage actress, taking her first professional job in Howard Goodall's Days of Hope at the King's Head Theatre. She then took on various parts, before starting an intensive course in musical theatre at the Royal Academy of Music. After completing two months in RAM and one month in Arts Educational Schools, she left after two months to join the UK touring production of Zorro, playing the part of Luisa. Subsequently, landing a part in a musical as a sassy 40-year-old singer, the producer of the show then asked Atkinson to audition for the role of Daniela in the musical In The Heights, which she subsequently played at the King's Cross Theatre. She has since played Princess Jasmine in Aladdin alongside Priscilla Presley, Serena in Legally Blonde at Kilworth House, and Snow White opposite Jerry Hall at Richmond Theatre. She has also originated the role of Katherine Howard in the West End production of Six.

On 13 February 2020, Atkinson began playing the role of Vivian Ward in the West End production of Pretty Woman: The Musical alongside Danny Mac at the Piccadilly Theatre. The show later officially opened on 2 March 2020, but closed only two weeks later due to the COVID-19 pandemic. Atkinson returned to the show for its reopening at the Savoy Theatre on 8 July 2021.

Recording & Music
Atkinson released her debut studio album Step Inside of Love with Jay Records in 2017. As a member of the girl group Goldstone, she competed in Eurovision: You Decide 2018 with the song "I Feel The Love". Atkinson's recordings include:

Step Inside Love - debut solo album
I Feel The Love - BBC
100 Greatest Musicals - recorded at Abbey Road Studios
Postman and The Poet
Kurt Weill's One Touch of Venus
 ‘Six The Musical’ Studio Cast recording

SVN 
In 2021, Atkinson formed a seven piece girl group called SVN with six other members of the original West End cast of Six, Millie O'Connell, Natalie May Paris, Alexia McIntosh, Jarnéia Richard-Noel, Maiya Quansah-Breed, and Grace Mouat. In 2022, the group released a number of singles such as "Woman" and "Free"

Pretty Woman 
On June 18, 2021, Atkinson released the single "Pretty Woman", a contemporary reimagining of Roy Orbison’s Pretty Woman.

Concert performances
 ‘'Fridays Night is Music Night’' on many occasions.
 Barbara Windsor's 70th Birthday BBC Radio 2 live from Hackney Empire. 
 Great British Musical (Perfect Pitch) - What's On Stage Awards.
 Stephen Sondheim's 70th Birthday Concert.

Filmography
 Nikki Martin - Doctors, BBC.
 Anna Karenina - American Express Commercial.
 Voice over for Thompson Holidays. 
 Snow White I-dents - Christmas Special, GMTV.
 Snow White Documentary 'Seven Dwarfs', Channel 4, 
 Backing vocalists for 'The Michael Ball Show' and 'Britain's Got Talent', ITV. 
 BBC Wales ‘Search for a Musical Theatre Star’ and subsequently ‘A Musical Star is Born’.

Podcasts

Charity work
 24 Hour Musical Marathon live stream for Save the Children

References

External links
 

Living people
1987 births
21st-century English actresses
21st-century English women singers
21st-century English LGBT people
Actresses from Hertfordshire
English musical theatre actresses
English stage actresses
LGBT actresses
English LGBT actors
English LGBT singers
People from Stevenage
Singers from London